Marañón may refer to:

 Marañón, Navarre, a town and municipality in Spain 
 Marañón River, in Peru
 Marañón Province, in Peru
 Valle del Marañón, a valley in Peru
 Gregorio Marañón (1887–1960), Spanish physician, historian, writer and philosopher
 Marañón (footballer), real name Rafael Carlos Pérez González, Spanish footballer
 the Spanish word for the cashew apple in Central America

See also
Maranhão - Brazilian state